Max Oswald (14 April 1906 – after 1928) was a Swiss footballer who played for FC Basel during the late 1920s. He played as a forward.

Oswald joined Basel's first team in 1926. During his first season, he played in only one league match and in one friendly game. He played his domestic league debut for the club in the home game at the Landhof on 14 May 1927 as Basel won 1–0 against Concordia Basel. He scored his first goal for his club during the 1927–28 Serie A season on 19 February 1928 in the home game against Solothurn as Basel won 4–0.

Between 1926 and 1929 Oswald played 24 games for Basel scoring four goals; 11 of these games were in the Swiss Serie A, 1 in the Swiss Cup and 12 were friendly games. He scored three goals in the domestic league, the other was scored during the test games.

References

Sources
 Rotblau: Jahrbuch Saison 2017/2018. Publisher: FC Basel Marketing AG. 
 Die ersten 125 Jahre. Publisher: Josef Zindel im Friedrich Reinhardt Verlag, Basel. 
 Verein "Basler Fussballarchiv" Homepage

FC Basel players
Swiss men's footballers
Association football forwards
1906 births
Year of death missing